Milonov, or Milonoff (masculine) or Milonova (feminine) is a Russian-language surname

 Eero Milonoff (born 1980), Finnish actor
 Vitaly Milonov (born 1974), Russian politician
 Yuri Milonov (1895–1980), Bolshevik activist and educationalist

Russian-language surnames